Latur district (Marathi pronunciation: [laːt̪uːɾ]) is a district in Maharashtra state of India. Latur city is the district headquarters and is the 16th largest city in the state of Maharashtra. The district is primarily agricultural. Urban population comprises 25.47% of the total population.

Officer

Members of Parliament
Sudhakar Tukaram Shrangare (BJP) 
Omprakash Rajenimbalkar (SS(UBT))

Guardian Minister

list of Guardian Minister

District Magistrate/Collector

list of District Magistrate / Collector

History

Latur has an ancient history, which probably dates to the Rashtrakuta period. It was home to a branch of Rashtrakutas which ruled the Deccan 753-973 AD. The first Rashtrakuta king Dantidurga was from Lattalur, probably the ancient name for Latur. Anecdotally, Ratnapur is mentioned as a name for Latur.

The King Amoghavarsha of Avinash developed Latur city, originally the native place of the Rashtrakutas. The Rashtrakutas who succeeded the Chalukyas of Badami in 753 AD called themselves the residents of Lattalur.

It was, over the centuries, ruled by the Satavahanas, the Sakas, the Chalukyas, the Yadavas of Devgiri, the Delhi Sultans, the Bahamani rulers of South India, Adilshahi, and the Mughals.

In the 17th century, it became part of the independent princely state of Hyderabad. Under the Hyderabad of Nizams, the tax system was reformed and many of the exploitative taxing practices were ended. In 1905 it was merged with surrounding areas, renamed Latur tehsil, and became part of Osmanabad district, which until 17  September 1948 was a part of Hyderabad Kingdom under the Nizams. The chief of Nizam's Razakar army Qasim Rizwi was from Latur.

After independence and the merger of Hyderabad with the Indian Union, Osmanabad became part of Bombay Province. On 1 May 1960, with the creation of Maharashtra, Osmanabad was one of its districts. Because of the concerted efforts of Former Cooperation minister Keshavrao Sonawane and then newly elected member of assembly Vilasrao Deshmukh on 16 August 1982, a separate Latur district was carved out of Osmanabad district.

In Latur's Papvinashak Temple a 12th-century Kannada inscription of Western Chalukya emperor Someshvara III was found. According to that inscription, 500 scholars were living in Lattlaur (Latur) at that time and that Latur was the city of King Someshwar.

Geography 
Latur district is in the Marathwada region in Maharashtra in India, located between 17°52' North to 18°50' North and 76°18' East to 79°12' East in the Deccan plateau. The entire district of Latur is on the Balaghat plateau, 540 to 638 metres from the mean sea level.

Latur District is bound by Nanded district to the northeast, Bidar district of Karnataka to the southeast, Osmanabad district to the south-west, and Beed and Parbhani districts to the northwest.

On 30 September 1993 an earthquake struck Latur. It is the 16 largest city in Maharashtra.

Climate 
Average rainfall in the district is 600 to 800 mm. This is usually during the monsoon months from July to October. Moderate temperatures are mainly observed. The rainfall is unpredictable in tune with the Indian monsoon. Summers begin from early March to July. Summers are dry and hot. The temperature ranges from 25 °C to 39.6 °C, though at the peak they may reach 45 °C. November to January is the winter season. Temperatures at the peak drop to single digits but usually they hover around 12 °C to 21.8 °C sometimes lowers up to 11 °C. January to March are the months with moderate temperatures.

Rivers, lakes and dams 
The district lies in the Godavari river basin. Much of the water used in the district comes from the Manjara River, which suffered from environmental degradation and silting in the late 20th and early 21st centuries.  Other major rivers of the district are the Terna (Tirna), Rena, Manar, Tawarja (Tawarjo), Tiru and Gharni. These rivers and a number of smaller ones are dammed to provide both irrigation and drinking water. Large dams include the Devargan Dam, Gharni Dam, Masalga Dam, Sakol Dam on the Sol River, Tawarja Dam, and Tiru Dam. On the northern plains of the district there are three main rivers, the Manyad, the Lendi (a tributary of the Teru), and the Teru (Tiru).

Demographics

According to the 2011 census Latur district had a population of 2,454,196, roughly equal to the nation of Kuwait or the US state of Nevada. This gives it a ranking of 181st among the districts of India (out of a total of 640). Its population growth rate over the decade 2001-2011 was 18.04%. Latur had a sex ratio of 924 females for every 1000 males, and a literacy rate of 79.03%. 25.46% of the population lived in urban areas. Scheduled Castes and Scheduled Tribes make up 19.60% and 2.34% of the population respectively.

At the time of the 2011 Census of India, 81.75% of the population in the district spoke Marathi, 8.08% Hindi, 6.37% Urdu and 1.82% Lambadi as their first language.

Culture and Religion 
Shri Siddeshwar fair at Latur is held every year. Thousands of people attend the Gangaram Maharaj Samadhi every Ekadashi at Hattibet in Udgir tehsil.

In January 2011, the first ever 'Latur Festival' was organised on 10, 11 and 12 January under the guidance of Mr. Amit Deshmukh. The grand success of this event has now ensured a permanent spot on the cultural calendar. Now this is an annual fixture. The event is organised by the Latur Club.

Education

Latur pattern 
The Latur Pattern of study was developed by former principals Janardan Waghmare and Aniruddha Jadhav of Rajarshi Shahu College in Latur, India. 
 
The 'Latur pattern' is a combination of special training and intensive coaching. Students solve a series of probable question papers and attend coaching sessions to prepare them for the exams.

Latur pattern is a mechanical methodology of continuous study designed to help students in providing point-to-point answers to questions which could be expected in the examination.  It became the standard for secondary, higher secondary, and university education in the Maharashtra state of India. This educational technique has become widely adopted in other parts of the state due to the success of student's in Maharashtra on the standardized Common Entrance Examinations (CET).

This methodology, has been criticized by many educators in India, who consider it a tool to gain temporary advantage, that does not prepare them for advanced learning.

Higher education
In past few years, Latur has emerged as an educational hub for higher education. There are many institutions which offer bachelor's degree, and master's degree. Most of the well established professional degree colleges are located in Latur city, many have recently been erected in sub-urban area. Being renowned for its glorious results, Latur city attracts many students from different parts of state.

Primary and secondary education
There are as many as 1284 primary schools run by and 487 private schools affiliated to the Education department of Latur District Council. The primary medium of teaching in most of these schools is Marathi. However; many schools observe English, Semi-English, Urdu medium of teaching. Latur is known for its Latur Pattern which has given toppers to the state for many years in HSC and SSC exams conducted by MSBSHSE.

Divisions
Administratively the district is divided into five subdivisions namely Latur, Nilanga, Ausa, Ahmadpur  and Udgir, and further divided into ten talukas & ten Panchayat Samitis. These are Latur, Udgir, Ahmedpur, Ausa, Nilanga, Renapur, Chakur, Deoni, Shirur Anantpal, and Jalkot. Latur city is the administrative headquarters of the district. There are around 945 villages & 786 Gram Panchayats in the district.

There are six Vidhan Sabha constituencies in Lutur District. These are Latur City, Latur Rural, Udgir, Ausa, Nilanga and Ahmedpur. The district votes in two Lok Sabha constituencies Osmanabad for Ausa, and Latur for the other five.

Cities and towns

Latur city is only a municipal corporation in the district Udgir, Ahmadpur, Ausa, Nilanga are the major urban centers in the district and all have Municipal Councils. The following are the 28 largest villages, administered by gram panchayats, followed by their 2011 population:
 Murud 25,978
 Chakur 16,122
 Killari 15,259
 Nalegaon 14,983
 Aurad Shahajani 12,894
 Renapur 11,596
 Deoni 11,276
 Pangaon 10,521
 Kingaon 9,665
 Shirur Tajband 9,191
 Shirur Anantpal 8,682
 Kasarshirshi 8,139
 Wadhawana 8,132
 Jalkot 7,912
 Wadwal Nagnath 7,289
 Sakol 7,018
 Hadolti 7,013
 Ujani 6,434
 Matola 6,393
 Kharola 6,260
 Babhalgaon 7,353
 Bhada 5,938
 Halgara 5,844
 Handarguli 5,801
 Chapoli 5,778
 Nitoor 5,751
 Lohara 5,682
Chincholi Ballalnath 5,053

Places of interest 

 Udgir fort: Udgir town has witnessed the war between the Marathas and the Nizam of Hyderabad which took place in 1761. The Marathas led by Sadashivrao Bhau defeated the Nizam and the treaty of Udgir was signed. In the fort are several palaces Durbar halls and the Samadhi of Udaygir Maharaj which is  under the normal ground level. The fort has some rare inscriptions written in Arabic and Persian.
 Ausa Fort: This fort is situated in a depression surrounded by high ground on all the sides, so that from its highest point one can have a view of approaching armies, even at a great distance, while the main parts of the fort remain hidden.
The sculptures in the cave include Buddha, Narsimha, Shiv Parvati, Kartikeya, and Ravan among many others. According to the historians these caves were built in the sixth century during the Gupta period. The temple "Renuka Devi Mandir", and mosque "Pirpasha Darga" are also situated around the caves. 
 Wadwal Nagnath Bet (Hill): This hill is home to very rare species of Ayurvedic bushes and plants.
 Hattibet-Devarjan: Located near Udgir, on a small hill is the Samadhi of Gangaram Maharaj. The place is also known for cave carvings. The place has given birth to several freedom fighters who died in the Hyderabad freedom struggle.
 Sai Nandanwan: Another tourist spot near Chakur. A temple of Satya Sai Baba is situated in the middle of the park.
 Lohara: A village in Udgir Taluka known for the Mahadev Bet (hill) & Gabeisaheb Bet. Beninath maharaj math is operative since the times of Nizam shahi dynasty.
 Dongraj:  A village in Chakur tehsil known for Malleppa temple of lord Shiva situated at border of five villages. The pilgrimage at Dongraj is organised at Malleppa Temple during shravani months and temple of sant Ambadas Maharaj. Various sports tournaments are organised during pilgrimage.
 Shri Keshav Balaji Devasthan Ausa : A Hindu Mandir near Ausa city placed on Yakatpur Road. It is created on the basis of Balaji Mandir Tirupati. This Temple & some Surrounding area is a private property but every devotee can go there for Darshan or Tourisms. It is the second most attractive place in Ausa City after 'The Ausa Fort'. Accommodation Facility is available near the temple.

Economy
Latur became one of the important trading hub during the time of Nizams of Hyderabad. It is an industrial center as well as agriculture-based economy. Latur has become the rising Industrial Hub Of Marathwada.

Latur is known all over India for the quality and quantity of pulses that it produces especially Pigeon pea. Latur is also a major trading center for Urad, Moong and Channa along with Toor. Also it is known for trading in Oil Seeds mainly Sun-flower and Soya Bean, kardi (safflower), nutcrackers, locks, brassware, milk powder, ginning and pressing.  It is also home to several sugar mills like Manjra, Rena, Vikas, Jagruti etc.

GDVA Per Capita (At Current Price) of Latur district was ₹1,34,634 in 2019–2020. This records an increase from the previous number of ₹1,23,044.

Transport

Air
Latur Airport is located near Chincholiraowadi, northwest of Latur city. The Airport was constructed in 1991 by Public Works Department (PWD) and then handed over to MIDC. It was upgraded at a cost of nearly Rs.140 million and is being operated on a 99-year lease by Reliance Airport Developers (RADPL). There is no scheduled air service currently from latur airport although the airport sees 14 to 16 aircraft movements a month.

Highways 
Several National & State Highways cross Latur district. They include:
 Tuljapur-Ausa- Latur-Ahmadpur- Nanded-Yavatmal-Wardha-Nagpur NH 361
 Mantha, Deogoan Fata, Selu, Pathari, Sonpeth, Parali Vaijnath, Ambajogai, Renapurphata, Latur(NH361), Ausa, Omarga, Yenegur, Murum, Alur, Akkalkot, Nagasur, NH52 near Bijapur (Vijapur) 548B
 Talegaon Dabhade, Chakan, Shikrapur, Nhavare, Srigonda, Jalgaon, Jamkhed, Patoda, Manjarsumba, Kaij, Ambajogai, Kingaon, NH361 near Chakur 548D
 Jintur, Bori, Zari, Parbhani, Gangakhed, Isad, Kingaon, Dhanora, Wadval, Nagnath, Gharani, Nalegoan, Nitur, Nilanga, Sirshi, Aurad Shajani, NH50 near Bhalki 752K
 Barshi, Yedshi, Dhoki, Murud, Latur, Renapur, Nalegaon, Dighoi, Udgir, Deglur, Adampur, Khatgoan, Sagroli,bodhan Nizamabad, Metpalli, Mancheral,
Chinnur, Sironcha, Bijapur, Jagdalpur, Kotapad, NH26 near Boriguma NH 63
 Parali Vaijnath, Dharmapuri, Pangaon, Renapur Phata NH 361H
 Nanded- Osmannagar-Kandhar- Jalkot- Udgir- Bidar
 Latur- Nitur- Nilanga- Aurad Shahajani- Zaheerabad
 Daund—Barsi—Osmanabad—Bantal—Ausa State Highway (SH 77)
 Manjarsumba—Kaij—Lokhandi—Savargaon State Highway.

Buses 

Bus routes to the district headquarters connect 96% of the villages.

The municipal bus system operates buses that serve the region and connect places in Latur City. The State Transport buses of Maharashtra State Road Transport Corporation (MSRTC) serves all villages in the district.

Railway Lines 
All railway lines through Latur are broad gauge. They belong to  Central Railway

Latur railway station was built again when the Barshi railway line was converted from narrow gauge to broad gauge. The railway gauge was converted in September 2007 from Latur to Osmanabad and in October 2008 from Osmanabad to Kurduvadi. Latur is now is connected to Mumbai by a direct train via Kurduvadi (train number 1006 from Latur and 1005 from Mumbai). It is connected to Hyderabad by train number 7013 that originates at Osmanabad.
With the introduction of train number 1005 via Kurduvadi in October 2008, the earlier train connecting Latur to Latur Road, Parbhani and Aurangabad was discontinued.

The important railway stations are Latur, Latur Road and Udgir. The district has 148 km of broad gauge railway line.

The railway line from Latur to Kurduwadi to Miraj was narrow gauge. The Kurduwadi-Pandharpur section towards Miraj was converted to broad gauge in 2002.  The Latur to Osmanabad section was converted to broad gauge in September 2007.  (Osmanabad did not lie on the narrow gauge railway line and the alignment was changed for the new broad gauge track to pass through Osmanabad.)  The Osmanabad-Kurduwadi section of broad gauge track became operational in October 2008. The Pandharpur-Miraj section was also narrow gauge earlier and the conversion to broad gauge is done on priority. This is very important route to Goa. Trains will help them achieve Konkan and Goan markets and hence the poor economy of these people will improve.

Sports

The Maharashtra Cricket Association is planning to construct their home ground near Latur City.
Also a Divisional sports complex have been sanctioned for Latur region, which would cater to the needs of players in Latur, Osmanabad and Nanded districts.

National Level Kabaddi and Basket Ball were held in Latur district. Latur Region is still awaiting to get a Krida Prabodhini.

Medical Facilities 
Latur District is served by 12 government hospitals, 46 Primary Health Centers, 19 dispensaries and 234 primary health support groups. A Super Specialty Hospital is taking place in Latur which would benefit to the patients in 11 adjoining districts. In addition to these there are a large number of private hospitals as well.

Along with that, Latur has two medical colleges namely "Government Medical College and Hospital", and "MIMSR Medical College & Hospital", the latter of which is privately owned.

Media and Communication
Post office: According to 1991 census, only 250 villages of total 914 had post offices, serving 52.27% of the rural population.

Latur Earthquake of 1993

Latur had a devastating, though only low magnitude, earthquake on 30 September 1993 resulting in a huge loss of life. The earthquake measured only 6.3 on the Richter scale but more than 30,000 people were estimated to have died mainly due to poor construction of houses and village huts made of stones which just collapsed on people who were fast asleep in early morning hours. It struck southern Marathwada region of Maharashtra state in central-western part of India and affected Latur, Beed, Osmanabad and adjoining districts about 400 km south-east of Mumbai (Bombay). It was an intra-plate earthquake. Latur was almost completely destroyed and life came to a standstill. The earthquake's focus was around 12 km deep - relatively shallow causing shock waves to cause more damage. The number of lives lost was high as the earthquake occurred at 3.56 a.m. local time when people were fast asleep.

After the earthquake, seismic zones were reclassified and building codes and standards were revised all over India.

See also

Make in Maharashtra
Marathwada
List of people from Latur

References

External links

 Official website of District, Latur.
 Official website of District Council, Latur

 
Districts of Maharashtra
1982 establishments in Maharashtra
Marathwada
Aurangabad division